Meic Stevens (born 13 March 1942) is a Welsh singer-songwriter. Stevens's songs have a mystical, faintly psychedelic flavour, and are mostly sung in his native Welsh language. Still largely unknown outside Wales, he was discovered by DJ Jimmy Savile, who saw him performing in a Manchester folk club in 1965. This led to Stevens recording his first single – with arranger John Paul Jones (later of Led Zeppelin) – for Decca Records that same year, though it sold badly.

Early life
In 1967 he suffered a nervous breakdown and retreated to his home village of Solva (in Pembrokeshire) to recuperate, and started to write songs in Welsh in a concerted effort to create a distinctive national pop music. From 1967 to 1969 he recorded a series of now rare Welsh-language picture sleeve EPs (Mike Stevens, Rhif 2 (Number 2), Mwg (Smoke), Y Brawd Houdini ( The Brother Houdini), Meic Stevens, Diolch yn Fawr (Many Thanks), Byw yn y Wlad (Living in the Country)). These were made for local labels like Sain and Wren, for whom he was one of the first artistes to record. He also performed around Britain during the '60s, playing on recording sessions (notably for his friend Gary Farr's debut album on the Marmalade label). He made a one-off English language LP, Outlander, for Warner Bros. Records in 1970, but the contract was abandoned by mutual consent. Today, like his other LPs of the period, Gwymon (Seaweed) and Gog (Cuckoo), it is very rare and highly sought after.

Career
Today Stevens' psych-folk influence can be heard in contemporary Welsh groups such as Super Furry Animals and Gorky's Zygotic Mynci, and his song "Cwm y Pren Helyg" was recently covered by Alun Tan Lan. Several CDs of his are available from the Sain label in Caernarfon, and two volumes of his classic 1960s EPs have recently appeared on Sunbeam Records.

Stevens can be found occasionally singing in certain pubs/hotels in Aberystwyth until the late hours. He can also be seen performing regularly throughout Wales and England at major festivals, eisteddfodau, pubs, theatres etc. He performs periodically in France, mainly Brittany where he is very popular.

Albums
 Outlander (1970, Warner Bros)
 Gwymon (Wren, 1972)
 Gog (1977, Sain 1065M)
 Caneuon Cynnar (1979, Tic Toc TTL001)
 Nos Du, Nos Da (1982, Sain 82)
 Gitâr yn y Twll dan Stâr (Sain, 1983)
 Lapis Lazuli (Sain, 1985 Sain 1312M)
 Gwin a Mwg a Merched Drwg (Sain, 1987)
 Bywyd ac Angau/Life And Death (Fflach, 1989)
 Ware’n Noeth – Bibopalwla’r Delyn Aur (1991, Sain SCD 4088)
 Er Cof am Blant y Cwm (1993, Crai CD036)
 Y Baledi – Dim ond Cysgodion (1992, Sain SCD 2001)
 Voodoo Blues (1993? Bluetit Records MS1)
 Yn Fyw (1995, Sain)
 Ghost Town (1997, Tenth Planet TP028)
 Mihangel (1998, Crai CD059)
 Ysbryd Solva (2002, Sain SCD 2364)
 September 1965: The Tony Pike Session (2002, Tenth Planet TP056)
 Disgwyl Rhywbeth Gwell i Ddod (2002 Sain SCD 2345)
 Outlander (2003, Rhino Handmade RHM2 7839 re-release)
 Meic a'r Gerddorfa (2005, Sain SCD 2499)
 Rain In The Leaves: The EPs vol. 1 (2006, Sunbeam SBRCD5021)
 Sackcloth & Ashes: The EPs vol. 2 (2007, Sunbeam SBRCD5033)
 Icarws (2007, Sain 2516)
 An Evening With Meic Stevens: Recorded Live In London (2007, Sunbeam SBRCD5039)
 Gwymon (2008, Sunbeam SBRCD5046)
  Love Songs '' (2010)

References

External links

Welsh songwriters
Welsh-speaking musicians
Welsh male singers
Welsh-language singers
Living people
1942 births
20th-century Welsh male singers
British male songwriters